A national research and education network (NREN) is a specialised internet service provider dedicated to supporting the needs of the research and education communities within a country.

It is usually distinguished by support for a high-speed backbone network, often offering dedicated channels for individual research projects.

In recent years NRENs have developed many 'above the net' services.

List of NRENs by geographic area

East and Southern Africa
 UbuntuNet Alliance for Research and Education Networking - the Alliance of NRENs of East and Southern Africa
 Eb@le - DRC NREN
 EthERNet - Ethiopian NREN
 iRENALA - Malagasy NREN
 KENET - Kenyan NREN
 MAREN - Malawian NREN
 MoRENet - Mozambican NREN
 RENU - Ugandan NREN
 RwEdNet - Rwanda NREN
 SomaliREN - Somali NREN
 SudREN - Sudanese NREN
 TENET/SANReN - South African NREN
 TERNET - Tanzanian NREN
 Xnet - Namibian NREN
 ZAMREN - Zambian NREN

North Africa
 ASREN - Arab States Research and Education Network
 TUREN - Tunisian NREN
 MARWAN - Moroccan NREN
 ENREN - Egyptian NREN
 ARN (Algeria) - Algerian NREN
 SudREN - Sudanese NREN
 SomaliREN - Somali NREN

West and Central Africa
 WACREN - West and Central African Research and Education Network
 GARNET - Ghanaian NREN
 TogoRER - Togolese NREN
 GhREN - Ghanaian NREN
 MaliREN - Mali NREN
 Niger-REN - Nigerien NREN
 RITER - Côte d'Ivoire NREN
 SnRER - Senegalese NREN
 NgREN - Nigerian NREN
 Eko-Konnect Research and Education Network - Nigerian NREN
LRREN - Liberia Research and Education Network

Asia Pacific
 APAN - Asia-Pacific Advanced Network
 AARNet - Australian NREN
 AfgREN - Afghanistan NREN
 BDREN - Bangladeshi NREN
 CSTNET - China Science and Technology Network
 CERNET - China Education and Research Network
 ERNET - Indian NREN
 HARNET - Hong Kong NREN
 KOREN - Korean NREN
 KREONET- Korean NREN
 IDREN - Indonesian NREN
 LEARN - Sri Lankan NREN
 SINET - Japanese NREN
 MYREN - Malaysian NREN
 NKN - Indian NREN
 NREN - Nepal NREN
 NREN - Islamic Republic of Iran NREN
 REANNZ - New Zealand NREN
 PERN - Pakistani NREN
 PREGINET - Philippine NREN
 SingAREN - Singaporean NREN
 TWAREN - Taiwanese NREN
 UniNet - Thai NREN
 VinaRen - Vietnamese NREN
 CamREN- Cambodia NREN
 TEIN - Trans Eurasia Information Network

North America
 United States – although advocated since the 1980s, the U.S. does not have one single NREN.

{| class="wikitable"
|-
! Name !! Type
|-
| Internet2 || national 
|-
| National LambdaRail || national [closed]
|-
| vBNS || national [closed]
|-
|Edge
|state (New Jersey)
|-
| ESnet || national 
|-
| NEREN|| regional (New England)
|-
| CENIC || state (California) 
|-
| CEN || state (Connecticut) 
|-
| Illinois Century Network || state (Illinois)
|-
| KanREN|| state (Kansas) 
|-
| LEARN|| state (Texas) 
|-
| Merit Network || state (Michigan) 
|-
| NERO|| state (Oregon)
|-
| NCREN|| state (North Carolina)
|-
| NYSERNet || state (New York)
|-
| OARnet || state (Ohio)
|- 
| OSHEAN || state (Rhode Island)
|- 
| PennREN|| state (Pennsylvania) 
|-
| THEnet|| state (Texas) 
|-
| UEN || state (Utah)
|- 
| WVNET||state (West Virginia)
|}

 Canada
{| class="wikitable"
|-
! Name !! Type
|-
|CANARIE || national
|-
|ACORN-NL|| provincial (Newfoundland and Labrador)
|-
|ACORN-NS || provincial (Nova Scotia)
|-
|BCNET|| provincial (British Columbia)
|-
|Cybera || provincial (Alberta)
|-
|GTAnet|| provincial (Ontario)
|-
|ECN|| provincial (New Brunswick and Prince Edward Island)
|-
|MRnet|| provincial (Manitoba) 
|-
|ORION || provincial (Ontario)
|-
|RISQ || provincial (Quebec)
|-
|SRNet || provincial (Saskatchewan)
|}

Latin America

 RedCLARA - Cooperación Latino Americana de Redes Avanzadas (Association of Latin American NRENs)
 Innova-Red - Argentinian NREN
 ADSIB - Bolivian NREN
 RNP - Brazilian NREN
 REUNA - Chilean NREN
 RENATA - Colombian NREN
 RedCONARE - Costa Rican NREN
 CEDIA - Ecuadorian NREN
 RAICES - El Salvadoran NREN
 RAGIE - Guatemalan NREN
 Universidad Tecnológica Centroamericana (UNITEC) - Honduran NREN
 CUDI - Mexican NREN
 RENIA - Nicaraguan NREN
 RedCyT - Panamanian NREN
 Arandu - Paraguayan NREN
 RAAP - Peruvian NREN
 RAU - Uruguayan NREN
 REACCIUN CNTI?- Venezuelan NREN

Caribbean
 C@ribNET - Caribbean NREN
 TTRENT - Trinidad and Tobago NREN
 JREN - Jamaica NREN
 RADEI - NREN of the Dominican Republic

Europe
European Academic and Research Network
GÉANT - Develops and maintains the GÉANT backbone network on behalf of European NRENs. Formerly DANTE and TERENA.
 CEENet - Central and Eastern European Research Networking Association 
 Eumedconnect - South Mediterranean Backbone
 ANA Albanian NREN
 ASNET-AM - Armenian NREN
 ACOnet - Austrian NREN
 AzScienceNet Azerbaijan NREN
 BASNET - Belarus NREN
 Belnet - Belgian NREN
 BREN - Bulgarian NREN
 CESNET - Czech NREN
 CARNET - Croatian NREN
 CYNET - Cypriot NREN
 SURFnet - Dutch NREN
 EENet - Estonian NREN
 RENATER - French NREN
 Deutsches Forschungsnetz (DFN) - German NREN
 GRENA - Georgian NREN
 GRNET - Greek NREN
 KIFU/NIIF Program - Hungarian NREN
 HEAnet - Irish NREN
 GARR - Italian NREN
 KazRENA - Kazakhstan NREN
 SigmaNet - Latvian NREN
 LITNET - Lithuanian NREN
 RESTENA - Luxembourg NREN
 MARNET - Macedonian NREN
 RiċerkaNet - Maltese NREN
 RENAM - Moldovian NREN
 MREN - Montenegro NREN
 PIONIER (PSNC) - Polish NREN
 FCCN - Portuguese NREN
 RoEduNet - Romanian NREN
 RUNNet - Russian NREN
 AMRES - Serbian NREN
 ARNES - Slovenian NREN
 SANET - Slovakian NREN
 RedIRIS - Spanish NREN
 SWITCH - Swiss NREN
 ULAKBIM - Turkish NREN
 URAN - Ukrainian NREN
 Jisc - United Kingdom NREN, operator of the Janet network
 KREN - Kosovo NREN

Nordic countries
 NORDUnet - Nordic backbone network
 DeiC - Danish NREN
 FUNET - Finnish NREN
 RHnet - Icelandic NREN
 SUNET - Swedish NREN
 UNINETT - Norwegian NREN

Middle East
 Maeen Saudi Arabia NREN
Eumedconnect - Mediterranean/North African Backbone
 ANKABUT UAE NREN
 OMREN Omani NREN
 IUCC - Israeli NREN
 JUnet Jordanian NREN
 IRAN SHOA Iranian NREN
 PALNREN Palestinian NREN
 Lebanon
 Birzeit Uni/AlQuds Palestinian Authority
 QNREN - Qatar NREN
 HIAST Syrian NREN

Central Asia
 RUNNet - Russian University Network, Russian NREN
 ASNET-AM - Armenian
 AzScienceNet Azerbaijan NREN
 GRENA - Georgian NREN
 KazRENA - Kazakhstan NREN
 KRENA - Kyrgyzian NREN
 TuRENA - Turkmenistan NREN
 UZSCINET - Uzbekistan NREN

See also
 Information superhighway
 Libraries and the US National Research and Education Network

References

External links
 Terena Compendium
 Research and Education Networking FAQ

 *
Higher education
Internet terminology
Research and development organizations